The 2019-20 Omaha Mavericks men's ice hockey season was the 23rd season of play for the program and the 7th in the NCHC conference. The Mavericks represented the University of Nebraska Omaha and were coached by Mike Gabinet, in his 3rd season.

On March 12, 2020, NCHC announced that the tournament was cancelled due to the coronavirus pandemic, before any games were played.

Roster
As of July 12, 2019.

Standings

Schedule and Results

|-
!colspan=12 style=";" | Exhibition

|-
!colspan=12 style=";" | Regular Season

|-
!colspan=12 style=";" | 
|- align="center" bgcolor="#e0e0e0"
|colspan=12|Tournament Cancelled

Scoring Statistics

Goaltending statistics

Rankings

References

Omaha Mavericks men's ice hockey seasons
Omaha Mavericks
Omaha Mavericks
Omaha Mavericks
Omaha Mavericks